The 1987 IAAF World Women's Road Race Championships was the fifth edition of the annual international road running competition organised by the International Amateur Athletics Federation (IAAF). The competition was hosted by Monaco on 21 November 1987 in Monte Carlo and featured one race only: a 15K run for women. There were individual and team awards available, with the national team rankings being decided by the combined finishing positions of a team's top three runners. Countries with fewer than three finishers were not ranked.

The race was won by Ingrid Kristiansen of Norway in a championship record time of 47:17 minutes, breaking Aurora Cunha's three-year winning streak (the Portuguese was twelfth here). In a dominant display by the Norwegian, the runner-up Nancy Tinari (Canada) was over a minute and a half behind, while third-placer Maria Curatolo of Italy arrived nearly two minutes later. The team competition was won by Portugal (their first team title), led by Albertina Machado in sixth with Cunha and Conceição Ferreira in support. The Soviet Union took second place with a team of Yekaterina Khramenkova, Lyudmila Matveyeva and Marina Rodchenkova – though they matched Portugal on 32 points, they lost out on merit of a slower combined time. Great Britain was third in the team rankings, led by Paula Fudge.

Results

Individual

Team

References

1987
IAAF World Women's Road Race Championships
IAAF World Women's Road Race Championships
IAAF World Women's Road Race Championships
Sport in Monte Carlo
International athletics competitions hosted by Monaco